The 2018–19 Western Michigan Broncos women's basketball team represents Western Michigan University during the 2018–19 NCAA Division I women's basketball season. The Broncos, led by seventh year head coach Shane Clipfell, play their home games at University Arena as members of the West Division of the Mid-American Conference. They finished the season 10–20, 4–14 in MAC play to finish in fifth place of the West division. They lost in the first round of the MAC women's tournament to Northern Illinois.

Roster

Schedule
Source:

|-
!colspan=9 style=| Exhibition

|-
!colspan=9 style=| Non-conference regular season

|-
!colspan=9 style=| MAC regular season

|-
!colspan=9 style=| MAC Women's Tournament

See also
 2018–19 Western Michigan Broncos men's basketball team

References

Western Michigan
Western Michigan Broncos women's basketball seasons
Western Michigan
Western Michigan